Robin Li Yanhong (born 17 November 1968) is a Chinese software engineer and billionaire internet entrepreneur. He is the co-founder of the search engine Baidu. As of March 2022, his net worth was estimated at US$8.5 billion.

Li studied information management at Peking University and computer science at the University at Buffalo. In 1996, he created RankDex, the first web search engine with page-ranking and site-scoring algorithms. In 2000, he founded Baidu with Eric Xu. Li has been CEO of Baidu since January 2004. The company was listed on NASDAQ on August 5, 2005. Li was included as one of the 15 Asian Scientists To Watch by Asian Scientist Magazine on 15 May 2011.

In August 2014, Li was appointed by the United Nations Secretary General, Ban Ki-Moon, as co-chair of the Independent Expert Advisory Group on Data Revolution for Sustainable Development. Li is a member of the 12th Chinese People's Political Consultative Conference.

Early years
Li was born in Yangquan, Shanxi Province, where he spent most of his childhood. Both of his parents were factory workers. Li was the fourth of five children, and the only boy.

He earned a bachelor of management with a major in information management from Peking University. In the fall 1991, Li went to the University at Buffalo in the US to study for a doctorate in computer science. He received his master's degree in 1994, after deciding not to continue with the PhD.

RankDex
In 1994, Li joined IDD Information Services, a New Jersey division of Dow Jones and Company, where he helped develop a software program for the online edition of The Wall Street Journal. He also worked on improving algorithms for search engines. He remained at IDD Information Services from May 1994 to June 1997. In 1996, while at IDD, Li created the Rankdex site-scoring algorithm for search engine page ranking, which was awarded a U.S. patent. It was the first search engine that used hyperlinks to measure the quality of websites it was indexing, predating the very similar algorithm patent filed by Google two years later in 1998. Google founder Larry Page referenced Li's work in some of his U.S. patents for PageRank. Li later used his Rankdex technology for the Baidu search engine.

Road to Baidu
Li worked as a staff engineer for Infoseek, a pioneer internet search engine company, from July 1997 to December 1999. An achievement of his was the picture search function used by Go.com. Since founding Baidu in January 2000, Li has turned the company into the largest Chinese search engine, with over 80% market share by search query, and the second largest independent search engine in the world. On 5 August 2005, Baidu successfully completed its IPO on NASDAQ, and in 2007 became the first Chinese company to be included in the NASDAQ-100 Index. He appeared in CNN Money's annual list of "50 people who matter now" in 2007.

Recognition
In 2001, he was named one of the "Chinese Top Ten Innovative Pioneers". In 2002 and 2003, he was named one of the "IT Ten Famous Persons". In April 2004, he was named in the second session of "Chinese Software Ten Outstanding Young Persons". In  August 2005, he was named in the twelfth session of the "ASEAN Youth Award". In December 2005, he was named one of the "CCTV 2005 Chinese Economic Figures of The Year". In December 2006 he was named 2006's "World's Best Business Leader" by the American Business Weekly.

Personal life
Li is married to Dongmin Ma, who also works for Baidu. They have four children and live in Beijing, China.

References

External links

"NEWSMAKER-Baidu founder rules China's Web with pragmatism" by Melanie Lee, Reuters, 19 January 2010.
Robin Li profile, ir.baidu.com; accessed 3 May 2014. 
Robin Li delivers lecture at Stanford University's Entrepreneurship Corner, September 2009; accessed 3 May 2014. 
Asia.com; accessed 3 May 2014.

1968 births
Living people
21st-century Chinese businesspeople
21st-century inventors
Baidu people
Businesspeople from Shanxi
Businesspeople in information technology
Businesspeople in software
Chinese billionaires
Chinese computer businesspeople
Chinese computer scientists
Chinese inventors
Chinese software engineers
Chinese technology company founders
Dow Jones & Company people
Engineers from Shanxi
Internet pioneers
Peking University alumni
People from Yangquan
University at Buffalo alumni
Members of the 12th Chinese People's Political Consultative Conference
Members of the 13th Chinese People's Political Consultative Conference